Fantômas is a 1932 French crime film directed by Pál Fejös and starring Jean Galland, Tania Fédor and Thomy Bourdelle. It features the popular pulp character Fantômas, a supercriminal, and his nemesis Inspector Juve. It was loosely based on the original Fantômas novel by Marcel Allain and Pierre Souvestre. The film was one of a number of Fantômas adaptations made during the 20th century.

Cast
 Jean Galland as Fantômas / Étienne Rambert
 Tania Fédor as Lady Beltham
 Thomy Bourdelle as Inspector Juve
 Jean Worms as Lord Beltham
 Georges Rigaud as Charles Rambert
 Anielka Elter as la princesse Sonia Davidoff
 Marie-Laure as la marquise de Langrune
 Gaston Modot as Firmin, le valet de la marquise
 Roger Karl as Bonnet, le président de tribunal
 Maurice Schutz as l'abbé Sicot
 Philippe Richard as Michel, l'adjoint de Juve
 Georges Mauloy as le professeur Gabriel
 Paul Azaïs as le mécano

References

Bibliography
 Hardy, Phil (ed.) The BFI Companion to Crime. University of California Press, 1997.

External links
 

1932 films
1932 crime films
French crime films
1930s French-language films
Films directed by Paul Fejos
Fantômas films
Remakes of French films
Sound film remakes of silent films
French black-and-white films
1930s French films